Mustafa Er (born 11 January 1980) is a Turkish football coach and former player.

Professional career
A youth academy product of Bursaspor, Mustafa made his professional debut for Bursaspor in a 5-2 Süper Lig loss to Gaziantepspor on 20 March 1999. Mustafa transferred to Konyaspor from Bursaspor, becoming a stalwart in the midfield for the team.

Managerial career
After his retirement from football, Mustafa became a youth coach at Bursaspor, and worked his way up to assistant manager. On 10 April 2018, Mustafa was appointed interim manager of Bursaspor after Paul Le Guen was sacked.

References

External links
 
 TFF Manager Profile
 
 Mackolik Manager Profile

1980 births
Living people
Sportspeople from Bursa
Turkish footballers
Turkey youth international footballers
Turkish football managers
Bursaspor footballers
Konyaspor footballers
MKE Ankaragücü footballers
Denizlispor footballers
Süper Lig players
TFF Second League players
Bursaspor managers
Süper Lig managers
Association football midfielders